Qarah Baraz (also Romanized as Qarah Barāz; also known as Qareh Barār) is a village in Behi-e Feyzolah Beygi Rural District, in the Central District of Bukan County, West Azerbaijan Province, Iran. At the 2006 census, its population was 213, in 45 families.

References 

Populated places in Bukan County